Applied Sciences is a semi-monthly peer-reviewed open-access scientific journal covering all aspects of applied physics, applied chemistry, applied biology, and engineering, environmental, and earth sciences. It was established in 2011 and is published by MDPI. The editor-in-chief is Takayoshi Kobayashi (University of Electro-Communications).

Abstracting and indexing
The journal is abstracted and indexed in:

According to the Journal Citation Reports, the journal has a 2020 impact factor of 2.679.

References

External links

Semi-monthly journals
English-language journals
Multidisciplinary scientific journals
Publications established in 2011
MDPI academic journals